"Rebirthing" is a song by the Christian rock band Skillet, and it is the first single off their sixth album Comatose. The song has achieved a large amount of popularity in both the mainstream and Christian radio. The song was No. 1 on ChristianRock.Net's Weekly Top 30 for sixteen straight weeks, No. 3 on their Annual Top 100, and was the most requested song of the year in 2006. The song also charted at No. 9 on the Billboard Hot Christian Songs chart.

Track listing
"Rebirthing" – 3:53

Meaning
John Cooper explained the meaning of the song to theskilletsizzle.com; "in the end, it's just a song about second chances and I think we're living in a time now where a lot of people don't think that they deserve a second chance. You know, whether that's a second chance at life, or at a relationship, or when they think they've screwed something up too bad. And in this song it's basically saying it's never too late to start all over again, it's a message of hope and a lot of people aren't feeling very hopeful these days in our world."

Music video
A music video was shot for this video at the same time as the video for "Whispers in the Dark", and the two were released around the CD release at the same time. The "Rebirthing" video consists of the band playing in a very bright room with windows showing the sky outside (whereas the "Whispers" video takes place in a dark room filled with rain and rose petals). There are many flashes of a city from above, a man being grabbed by hands from his computer, and finally, a butterfly (to show the song's meaning of new life). Both videos have received play on Gospel Music Channel.

Song credits
John Cooper – lead vocals, bass
Korey Cooper – rhythm guitar, keyboards, co lead vocals 
Lori Peters – drums
Ben Kasica – lead guitar

Awards 

In 2007, the song was nominated for a Dove Award for Rock Recorded Song of the Year at the 38th GMA Dove Awards.

Charts

Certifications

References

2006 singles
2006 songs
Skillet (band) songs
Songs written by Brian Howes
Songs written by John Cooper (musician)
Lava Records singles
Atlantic Records singles
Ardent Records singles
Symphonic rock songs